Alexander Brown Johnston (1881 – 17 August 1917) was a Scottish professional footballer who played in the Scottish League for Falkirk as an outside right. He was nicknamed 'Spinner'.

Personal life 
Johnston worked for the Post Office for 20 years. He served as an acting bombardier in the Royal Garrison Artillery during the First World War and was killed in action in West Flanders on 17 August 1917. He was buried in Bard Cottage Cemetery, north of Ypres.

Career statistics

References 

Scottish footballers
1917 deaths
British Army personnel of World War I
British military personnel killed in World War I
1881 births
Royal Garrison Artillery soldiers
Scottish Football League players
Camelon Juniors F.C. players
Footballers from Falkirk
Falkirk F.C. players
Association football outside forwards
Scottish military personnel
Burials in Belgium

Association football inside forwards